Goodbye Blue Monday is the third album by the Canadian singer-songwriter Jeremy Fisher. It was released on March 11, 2007, by Aquarius Records in Canada and on August 28, 2007, in the United States.

The album title is the alternative name for Kurt Vonnegut's novel Breakfast of Champions.

Critical reception
Exclaim! wrote that "Fisher does have a pleasingly warm voice and a flair for melody, while the instrumentation and production work is solid." No Depression called Fisher "a better derivative than most, with a lucent voice and an almost too-easy facility with melody." The Washington Post wrote that the album "brim[s] with his jaunty, literate acoustic pop-folk."

Track listing
All songs were written by Jeremy Fisher, except where noted.
 "Scar that Never Heals" – 3:38
 "Jolene" – 3:08
 "Cigarette" (Fisher, Jay Joyce) – 3:04
 "American Girls" – 3:38
 "Goodbye Blue Monday" – 4:37
 "Lay Down (Ballad of Rigoberto Alpizar)" – 4:05
 "High School" – 3:48 / "Remind Me" on Canadian version — 3:33
 "Sula" – 4:05
 "16MM Dream" – 4:17
 "Left Behind" – 3:26
 "Fall for Anything" – 5:54

Personnel 
 Jeremy Fisher – vocals, guitar, harmonica, bass guitar, wurlitzer, B3, piano, accordion, synthesizers
 Hawksley Workman – drums, percussion, xylophone, backing vocals, bass guitar, guitar, synthesizers
 Jim Bryson – gang vocals, piano
 Kelly Prescott – vocals
 Kaylen Prescott – gang vocals
 Tracey Prescott – gang vocals
 Ken Friesen - engineer

References

Jeremy Fisher albums
2007 albums
Aquarius Records (Canada) albums